Yurcak Field is a 5,000 seat soccer-specific stadium on the main campus of Rutgers University in Piscataway Township, New Jersey. Fully acknowledged as The Soccer Stadium at Yurcak Field, it is named in honor of Ronald N. Yurcak, a 1965 All-American Rutgers Lacrosse player. The stadium opened in 1994.

History
The stadium is the official home of the Rutgers Scarlet Knights men's and women's soccer teams. It was the home of NJ/NY Gotham FC of the National Women's Soccer League until 2019 and the Rutgers men's and women's lacrosse teams from 1994 until 2013 when the Scarlet Knights' lacrosse teams moved to nearby SHI Stadium.

In 1999, Yurcak Field hosted a third round match of the 1999 Lamar Hunt U.S. Open Cup between the Staten Island Vipers of the A-League and the MetroStars, now the New York Red Bulls, of Major League Soccer. In 2003, the stadium hosted two matches of the 2003 Lamar Hunt U.S. Open Cup. A quarter-final match between the New England Revolution and the MetroStars and a semi-final match between D.C. United and the MetroStars with the MetroStars winning both matches.

The facility has hosted the Division II & III NCAA Men's Lacrosse Championship games in 1998, 2001, and 2002. It was also the home the New Jersey Pride of Major League Lacrosse from 2006 through 2008.

In June 2015, it was announced that Yurcak Field would receive enhanced locker rooms, a new training room and new general office space in the coming years as part of a campus wide program to upgrade Rutgers athletic facilities.

In March 2019, Yurcak Field underwent a surface renovation, as the pitch was replaced with Kentucky Bluegrass, cut at 7/8 inch and placed on a sand base surface. The grass was provided by Tuckahoe Turf Farm in New Jersey.

Rutgers hosted the 2019 Big Ten Women's Soccer Tournament with the Semifinals and Final being played at Yurcak Field on November 8 & 10, 2019.

Rutgers hosted the 2021 Big Ten Women's Soccer Tournament with the Semifinals and Final being played at Yurcak Field on November 4 & 7, 2021. The championship game between Rutgers and Michigan set a new venue record with a total of 5,103.

References

External links
 Yurcak Field, Rutgers University

Rutgers Scarlet Knights
NJ/NY Gotham FC
Women's Professional Soccer stadiums
Former National Women's Soccer League stadiums
Soccer venues in New Jersey
College soccer venues in the United States
Lacrosse venues in the United States
College lacrosse venues in the United States
Former Major League Lacrosse venues
Sports venues in New Jersey
Sports venues in the New York metropolitan area
Multi-purpose stadiums in the United States
Buildings and structures in Middlesex County, New Jersey
Tourist attractions in Middlesex County, New Jersey
Piscataway, New Jersey
1994 establishments in New Jersey
Sports venues completed in 1994